Warner Bros. Discovery, Inc. (WBD) is an American multinational mass media and entertainment conglomerate headquartered in New York City. It was formed after the spin-off of WarnerMedia by AT&T, and its merger with Discovery, Inc. on April 8, 2022.

The company's properties are divided into nine business units, including the flagship Warner Bros. film and television studios, comic book publisher DC Entertainment, Home Box Office, Inc. (which includes HBO), U.S. Networks (which includes the majority of the ad-supported cable networks of its predecessors, including Discovery, Scripps Networks, Turner Broadcasting, and Warner), CNN, Sports (which includes Motor Trend Group, AT&T SportsNet, TNT Sports, and Eurosport, among others), Global Streaming & Interactive Entertainment (which includes the Discovery+ and HBO Max streaming services, and video game publisher Warner Bros. Games), and International Networks. It also holds a minority stake in The CW and a majority stake in the Food Network (including its spin-off network Cooking Channel), all of which are alongside Nexstar Media Group, and the former alongside Paramount Global.

Background

Warner Bros., Turner Broadcasting System, Scripps Networks Interactive and Discovery, Inc. have conjoined histories over the years. Warner Bros. was founded in 1923 by four brothers, Harry, Albert, Sam, and Jack Warner, the company established itself as a leader in the American film industry before diversifying into animation, television, and video games and is one of the "Big Five" major American film studios, as well as a member of the Motion Picture Association (MPA). In 1965, Turner Broadcasting System was founded by Ted Turner and based in Atlanta, Georgia. A year later, Kinney National Company came into existence and its media division became Warner Communications before merging with Time Inc. in 1990 to become Time Warner. During its time as Warner Communications, the company made a number of further acquisitions.

In 1979, Warner formed a joint venture with credit card company American Express called Warner-Amex Satellite Entertainment. This company owned such cable channels as MTV, Nickelodeon, The Movie Channel, and VH1 (which was launched in 1985 on the channel space left by Turner's Cable Music Channel). Warner bought out American Express's half in 1984 and sold the venture a year later to the original iteration of Viacom, which renamed it MTV Networks (now known as Paramount Media Networks). In 1982, Warner purchased Popular Library from CBS Publications.

Meanwhile, Cable Education Network was founded in 1985 and was renamed to Discovery Communications in 1994. Scripps Networks Interactive was founded in 2008 spun off from E. W. Scripps Company's cable division.

On October 10, 1996, Time Warner acquired the Turner Broadcasting System; but the company later merged with AOL to form AOL Time Warner in 2001 and reverted back to Time Warner name in 2003. Time Warner spun off its cable division (later known as Spectrum owned by Charter Communications) and AOL (now owned by Yahoo! Inc.) in 2009 and Time Inc. was spun out in 2013, which was later acquired by Meredith Corporation in January 2018 and is now known as Dotdash Meredith. Discovery Communications acquired Scripps Networks Interactive in March 2018 and was renamed to Discovery, Inc. while AT&T acquired Time Warner that June. In March 2019, AT&T dissolved the Turner Broadcasting System as part of its reorganization of its media assets.

History

Formation (2021–2022)

On May 16, 2021, Bloomberg News reported that AT&T was considering an offer to divest equity interest in their media subsidiary WarnerMedia (the former Time Warner, which AT&T acquired in 2018 for just over $85 billion in an attempt to become a vertically integrated media conglomerate), and have it merge with Discovery, Inc. to form a new publicly traded company. AT&T and Discovery officially confirmed the agreement the next day; the merger would be structured as a Reverse Morris Trust, with AT&T shareholders holding a 71% interest in the new company's stock and appointing seven board members, and Discovery shareholders holding a 29% interest and appointing six board members. AT&T would receive US$43 billion in cash and debt from the divestment. The merger was expected to be completed in mid-2022.

The new company would be led by Discovery's current CEO, David Zaslav; WarnerMedia's CEO Jason Kilar's position in the new company was uncertain. Zaslav stated that the two companies would spend a combined US$20 billion annually on content (outpacing even Netflix). The company will aim to expand their streaming services, which includes WarnerMedia's HBO Max, to reach 400 million global subscribers. It was stated that the company would aim to achieve $3 billion in cost savings via synergies within two years.

On June 1, 2021, it was announced that the merged company would be known as Warner Bros. Discovery, and an interim wordmark was unveiled with the tagline "The stuff that dreams are made of"—a quote from the 1941 Warner Bros. film The Maltese Falcon. Zaslav explained that the company aimed to be the "most innovative, exciting and fun place to tell stories in the world", and would combine Warner Bros.' "fabled hundred-year legacy of creative, authentic storytelling and taking bold risks to bring the most amazing stories to life" with Discovery's "integrity, innovation and inspiration."

In an SEC Filing on November 18, 2021, Discovery Inc. revealed that talks with AT&T had fallen through, in April 2021, due to disagreements over the ownership of the new company between AT&T and Discovery shareholders, and the amount of debt transferred to Discovery when they merged with WarnerMedia, before talks resumed on May 17, 2021.

In November 2021, during an earnings call, Discovery Streaming CEO JB Perrette discussed possible options for its Discovery+ streaming service post-merger, including bundling the service with HBO Max and eventually merging them under a single platform with a mixture of both companies' technologies. He also noted that WBD may prioritize launching Discovery+ and HBO Max as a unified platform in markets where Discovery+ has yet to launch, such as another parts of the Asia-Pacific. On March 14, 2022, Discovery CFO Gunnar Wiedenfels—who would assume the same position post-merger—confirmed that such a transition was a long-term goal.

On December 22, 2021, the transaction was approved by the European Commission. On January 5, 2022, The Wall Street Journal reported that WarnerMedia and Paramount Global (at the time named ViacomCBS) were exploring a possible sale of either a majority stake or all of The CW, and that Nexstar Media Group (which became The CW's largest affiliate group when it acquired former WB co-owner Tribune Broadcasting in 2019) was considered a leading bidder. The news led to speculation that, should a sale take place, new ownership could steer the network in a new direction, transforming The CW from a young adult-oriented network into one that featured more unscripted and even national news programming. However, reports also indicated that WarnerMedia and ViacomCBS could include a contractual commitment that would require any new owner to buy new programming from those companies, allowing them to reap some continual revenue through the network. Network president/CEO Mark Pedowitz confirmed talks of a potential sale in a memo to CW staffers, but added that "It's too early to speculate what might happen" and that the network "must continue to do what we do best."

On January 26, 2022, AT&T CEO John Stankey stated that the merger was expected to close sometime during the second quarter of 2022. On February 1, 2022, it was reported that AT&T had finalized the structure of the merger: WarnerMedia would be spun off pro rata to AT&T's shareholders, and then merge into Discovery Inc. to form the new company. The transaction was approved by the Brazilian antitrust regulator Cade on February 7, followed by the United States Department of Justice on February 9. On March 11, 2022, the merger was approved by Discovery's shareholders. Due to the structure of the merger, it did not require separate approval from AT&T shareholders.

Beginning of operations (2022–present)
In an SEC filing on March 25, 2022, AT&T stated that two-way trading of WBD stock with that of AT&T would begin on April 4, 2022, and that a special dividend would be issued the next day to give AT&T shareholders a 0.24 share in WBD for each share of AT&T common stock they hold. The merger was officially completed on April 8, 2022, with trading beginning on the Nasdaq on April 11. At this time the company unveiled its final logo, designed by Chermayeff & Geismar & Haviv, which features a rendition of Warner Bros.' long-time shield logo.

The combined company retained several top executives from WarnerMedia, including film and television heads Toby Emmerich and Channing Dungey, and HBO and HBO Max chief content officer (CCO) Casey Bloys. Most of the company's top executive roles are filled by their Discovery counterparts, including Gunnar Wiedenfels as Warner Bros. Discovery's chief financial officer (CFO), JB Perrette as president and CEO of global streaming and interactive, and Discovery's chief lifestyle brands officer Kathleen Finch—whose role has been expanded to cover most of the combined company's U.S. linear networks, besides CNN (which was taken over by Chris Licht, replacing the outgoing Jeff Zucker), Magnolia Network (which reports to Bloys, after having previously reported directly to Zaslav under Discovery), and the Turner Sports unit (which would be overseen by the newly-formed Warner Bros. Discovery Sports division).

In an introductory town hall featuring Oprah Winfrey as host, Zaslav stated that the combined company would need to have "one culture" that "starts with people feeling safe, people feeling valued for who they are", as opposed what he described as a culture of internal competition between WarnerMedia's businesses. He also expected that "investment avoidance" via the consolidation of redundant business units (such as streaming) and staff would be one of the main ways that the company would achieve its promised $3 billion in cost savings. On April 21, 2022, Licht and Perrette announced the shutdown of CNN's streaming service CNN+, which had only launched two weeks prior to the completion of the merger; the new leadership considered it to be incompatible with their goal of a unified streaming service for all WBD properties.

In an investors' call on April 26 (concurrent with the first quarter earnings reports for Discovery Inc., its last prior to the merger), Zaslav contrasted the company's streaming businesses with those of Netflix (whose stock saw a decline after a quarterly loss in subscribers), describing Warner Bros. Discovery as being a "far more balanced and competitive company" that would "invest at scale smartly" and not "overspend" on growth and that its streaming businesses would complement its linear television. He stated that HBO Max had "meaningful subscriber churn", and that the planned merger of it with Discovery+ would help to reduce it by offering a broader array of content. It was reported that the company had also suspended scripted development at TBS and TNT, to evaluate their strategies moving forward. The following day, Zaslav purchased approximately $1 million worth of WBD stock.

On May 11, 2022, Warner Bros. Discovery eliminated several executive positions carried over from WarnerMedia, including Kids, Young Adults and Classics head Tom Ascheim, and general manager of TBS, TNT, and TruTV head Brett Weitz. These networks will be overseen by Finch as head of U.S. Networks, while the studios under the Kids, Young Adults and Classics division was moved under Warner Bros. Television. The same day, it announced an agreement with British telecom company BT Group for it to contribute its BT Sport channels into a 50/50 joint venture with its UK Eurosport channels, and eventually merge them. On June 9, WBD named former Discovery and Univision executive Luis Silberwasser as chairman of Sports.

In July 2022, Warner Bros. Pictures head Toby Emmerich announced that he would step down and establish a new studio, which will be funded by and have an exclusive, five-year distribution deal with Warner Bros. Pictures. Warner Bros. Pictures was then divided into three business units with their own leadership: former MGM executives Michael De Luca and Pamela Abdy became the co-chairs of Warner Bros. Pictures and New Line Cinema, and temporarily oversaw the DC Films and Warner Animation Group units. Alan Horn also rejoined Warner Bros. as a consultant.

WBD delivered its second-quarter earnings report on August 4, 2022. Ahead of the report, the company performed multiple cuts to HBO Max throughout July and early-August, including cutting new programming development in much of Europe, live-action children's programming development, and direct-to-streaming films—leading to the notable August 3 cancellations of the nearly-completed films Batgirl and Scoob! Holiday Haunt as tax write-offs, and the quiet removals of multiple HBO Max original films from the platform and its upcoming releases.

In the second quarter of 2022, WBD took $9.8 billion in revenue and a net loss of $2.2 billion pro forma, primarily from integration and restructuring expenses. The company took $825 million in write-offs on "content impairments and development". The company confirmed cuts to children's programming development, and abandoned the production of direct-to-streaming films for HBO Max—with Zaslav arguing that they lacked economic value and impact in comparison to theatrical releases. WBD renewed its contracts with Bloys and other key HBO executives, with Zaslav praising his performance as chief content officer. Zaslav stated that a "10-year plan" was in development for DC Films, modeled after those of Marvel Studios, while Perrette stated that the planned merger of Discovery+ and HBO Max would occur by summer 2023 in the United States, with other markets to follow.

HBO subsequently faced a reorganization on August 15 to dismantle most of HBO Max's autonomous units, with HBO Max's head of comedy Suzanna Makkos now reporting to HBO's head of comedy Amy Gravitt, and layoffs within HBO Max's non-scripted, live-action family entertainment, international originals, and casting units, as well as HBO's acquisitions unit. HBO Max also continued to remove and cancel some of its lesser-viewed original programming, particularly family-oriented and animated series.

In September 2022, WBD became the subject of a proposed class-action lawsuit by one of its shareholders, alleging that WarnerMedia was overinvesting in streaming content "without sufficient concern for return on investments", and had overstated the number of HBO Max subscribers by at least 10 million by counting inactivated subscriptions bundled with AT&T services—thus misleading investors in violation of the Securities Act. It also alleged that Discovery executives failed to warn investors that WarnerMedia's prospectus contained misleading statements.

On September 28 during a company town hall, Zaslav addressed speculation that WBD was pursuing a possible sale as early as 2024, stating that they were "absolutely not for sale", and "have everything we need to be successful." On October 11, Warner Bros. Television Group laid off 82 employees and eliminated 43 vacant positions as part of a restructuring that primarily impacts their unscripted and animation units. The restructuring saw the consolidation of Warner Horizon and Telepictures' creative operations, and the consolidation of Cartoon Network Studios' and Warner Bros. Animation's development and production teams (with the two studios remaining separate labels with their own distinct output).

In October 2022, it was announced that filmmaker James Gunn and producer Peter Safran would serve as the co-CEO and co-chairmen of DC Films which will be rebranded as DC Studios moving forward. The duo has signed a four-year deal that will oversee the production of films, television, and animation under the DC label. The pair will report directly to Zaslav, while also working alongside but independently with other members of the studio. Gunn will oversee creative development on DC projects, while Safran will oversee the business aspect. During an earnings report in November 2022, it was announced that the launch of WBD's streaming service had been moved up to spring 2023. In December 2022, CNN announced cutbacks and a reorganization to prioritize its "core" operations, resulting in sister channel HLN being brought under the auspices of Investigation Discovery and abandoning its remaining original live news programming.

On January 5, 2023, CFO Gunnar Wiedenfels confirmed that the company will no longer perform tax-write-offs. In January 2023, WBD announced  licensing agreements with advertiser-supported video on demand streaming services The Roku Channel and Tubi and they would  launch several WBTV-branded free-ad-supported television channels, that would feature content from WBD's television channels and Warner Bros. Television Studios, as well as films from Warner Bros. Pictures (some of which were previously removed from HBO Max), including Eight Is Enough, Cake Boss, Westworld, Babylon 5, The Bachelor, The Nevers, First Dates, Head of the Class, Hearts in Atlantis, How It's Made and Say Yes to the Dress: Atlanta, among others. On February 8, 2023, The Wall Street Journal reported that WBD had amended its plans to merge Discovery+ with HBO Max, with HBO Max's successor slated to include "most" Discovery content, and Discovery+ remaining operational to retain its subscriber base, and provide an alternative option for customers not interested in the higher-priced unified service. On February 24, WBD CEO David Zaslav confirmed the change of plans during an earnings call, saying that Discovery+ has "profitable subscribers that are very happy with the product offering".

In March 2023, WBD's new streaming service was set to be unveiled beginning April 12, 2023.

Assets

Warner Bros. Discovery consists of nine primary business divisions:
 Warner Bros. Entertainment consists of assets including DC Studios, Warner Bros. Theatre Ventures, Turner Entertainment, The Wolper Organization, WaterTower Music and Warner Bros. Studio Operations.
 Warner Bros. Pictures Group consists of the company's filmed entertainment and theatrical entertainment businesses, including Warner Bros. Pictures, New Line Cinema, Warner Animation Group and Castle Rock Entertainment. The division is led by former MGM executives Michael De Luca and Pamela Abdy.
 Warner Bros. Television Group consists of domestic and international network of television production companies, including the flagship Warner Bros. Television label, alongside Telepictures, Alloy Entertainment, Warner Bros. Animation, Cartoon Network Studios, Williams Street, and Warner Horizon Unscripted Television. The division is also responsible for 50% of All3Media and 12.5% of The CW. The division is led by Channing Dungey.
 Home Box Office, Inc. is the parent company of the HBO and Cinemax pay television services. The division, which also oversees the production of Warner Bros. Discovery's streaming service HBO Max Originals as well as the former Discovery joint venture Magnolia Network, is led by chairman and chief executive officer Casey Bloys.
 CNN Global operates the CNN news channel and other global broadcast news assets owned by Warner Bros. Discovery, including sister network HLN and various international CNN branches. The division is led by Chris Licht.
 DC Entertainment consists of the comic book publisher DC Comics and its associated intellectual properties. The unit works with other divisions of Warner Bros. Discovery on content adapted from its properties, such as films, television series and video games.
 Warner Bros. Discovery U.S. Networks owns and/or operates most of the company's linear cable networks in the United States, including the former brands of Discovery Communications channels (such as Discovery Channel, TLC, Animal Planet, OWN, and Investigation Discovery), Scripps Networks Interactive channels (such as Food Network and Cooking Channel with Nexstar Media Group, and HGTV), and Turner Broadcasting System channels (including TBS, TNT, TruTV, Turner Classic Movies, and Cartoon Network/Adult Swim among others). The division is led by Kathleen Finch.
 Warner Bros. Discovery Sports is the brand name used for sports-related divisions of the company. The American division manages the company's domestic broadcast sports businesses, including MLB Network, NBA TV and AT&T SportsNet, while the European division handles Warner Bros. Discovery's international sports operations, including Eurosport, Golf Digest and BT Sport, and the sports division of Warner Bros. Discovery in Latin America, Warner Bros. Discovery Sports Latin America which owns the sports channel TNT Sports which replaces Esporte Interativo. Both divisions are led by Luis Silberwasser.
 Warner Bros. Discovery Global Streaming & Interactive Entertainment manages the operations of the company's direct-to-consumer platforms, online brands and gaming businesses, including the streaming services HBO Max and Discovery+, video game publisher Warner Bros. Games, and the digital media company Rooster Teeth. The division is led by JB Perrette.
 Warner Bros. Discovery Global Brands and Experiences manages Warner Bros. theme parks and studio tours. Additional business segments include divisions responsible for Global Content Distribution (which comprises Warner Bros. Worldwide Television Distribution and Warner Bros. Home Entertainment) and Advertising Sales. The division is led by Bruce Campbell, who serves as the company's Chief Revenue Officer.
 Warner Bros. Discovery International focuses on local and regional variations that pipelined with global market through operations for its domestic television channels, including region-specific operations such as TVN Group in Poland and Three in New Zealand, as well as responsible for the distribution of linear networks from CNN Global and Warner Bros. Discovery Sports. The division is led by Gerhard Zeiler. It is split into four regional hubs: Warner Bros. Discovery Asia-Pacific, Warner Bros. Discovery EMEA, TVN Warner Bros. Discovery (Poland), and Warner Bros. Discovery Americas.

Leadership

 Board of Directors
 Samuel A. Di Piazza, Jr. (Chair)
 David Zaslav
 Robert R. Bennett
 Li Haslett Chen
 Richard W. Fisher
 Paul A. Gould
 Debra L. Lee
 Dr. John C. Malone
 Fazal Merchant
 Steven A. Miron
 Steven O. Newhouse
 Paula A. Price
 Geoffrey Y. Yang

 Executives
 David Zaslav, President and CEO
 Pam Abdy, Chairperson and CEO of Warner Bros. Film Group
 Casey Bloys, Chairman and CEO, HBO and HBO Max Content
 Bruce Campbell, Chief Revenue and Strategy Officer
 Savalle Sims, General Counsel
 Jon Steinlauf, Chief U.S. Advertising Sales Officer
 Mike De Luca, Chairperson and CEO of Warner Bros. Film Group
 Channing Dungey, Chairman, Warner Bros. Television Group
 Kathleen Finch, Chairman and Chief Content Officer, US Networks Group
 James Gunn, Co-Chairman and CEO of DC Studios
 David Leavy, Chief Corporate Affairs Officer
 Nathaniel Brown, Chief Corporate Communications Officer
 Chris Licht, Chairman and CEO of CNN Worldwide
 JB Perrette, CEO and President, Global Streaming and Interactive
 Avi Saxena, Chief Technology Officer
 Patrizio Spagnoletto, Global Chief Marketing Officer, Streaming
 Adria Alpert Romm, Chief People and Culture Officer
 Asif Sadiq, Chief Global Diversity, Equity and Inclusion Officer
 Peter Safran, Co-Chairman and CEO of DC Studios
 Luis Silberwasser, Chairman and CEO of Warner Bros. Discovery Sports
 Gunnar Wiedenfels, Chief Financial Officer
 Dave Duvall, Chief Information Officer
 Lori Locke, Chief Accounting Officer
 Gerhard Zeiler, President, International

References

External links
 

2022 establishments in New York City
American companies established in 2022
Cable network groups in the United States
Companies based in New York City
Conglomerate companies established in 2022
Conglomerate companies of the United States
Entertainment companies based in New York City
Entertainment companies established in 2022
Entertainment companies of the United States
Mass media companies based in New York City
Mass media companies established in 2022
Mass media companies of the United States
Multinational companies based in New York City
Multinational companies headquartered in the United States
Publicly traded companies based in New York City
Publishing companies established in 2022
Warner Bros. Discovery